T. flavescens may refer to:

 Tabebuia flavescens, a Brazilian evergreen tree
 Terebra flavescens, a sea snail
 Tetanops flavescens, a picture-winged fly
 Tetramoera flavescens, a tortrix moth
 Tetrathemis flavescens, a dragonfly first described in 1889
 Thanatus flavescens, a false crab spider
 Thereva flavescens, a stiletto fly
 Tipula flavescens, a crane fly
 Tithaeus flavescens, a Bornean harvestman
 Tithorea flavescens, a milkweed butterfly
 Titiotus flavescens, a tengellid spider
 Torodora flavescens, a long-horned moth
 Trichophyton flavescens, a sac fungus
 Trisetum flavescens, a true grass
 Tubercularia flavescens, a sac fungus
 Turbonilla flavescens, a sea snail
 Turuptiana flavescens, a South American moth
 Tytthus flavescens, a carnivorous insect